OBM may refer to:

 Of Blessed Memory, an honorific used in Judaism when naming and speaking of the deceased.
 Old Brewery Mission, a homeless shelter located in Montreal.
 Organizational Behavior Management, applying the study of behavior to organizations to promote worker safety and other benefits
 Original brand manufacturer, a company that sells a product made in whole or in part by a second company as its own branded product
 Outboard motor, a propulsion system for boats
 OBM, in steelmaking "Oxygen Blowing Machine", (also Oxygen-Bottom-Maxhütte, Oxygen-Bodenblas-Metallurgie German), a process in Steelmaking
 Official Bowl Makers, those professionally certified to craft bowls.
 Oliver Batista Meier, a German professional footballer